Gnathocerus is a genus of beetles belonging to the family Tenebrionidae.

The species of this genus are found in Europe, Africa and America.

Species:
 Gnathocerus cornutus (Fabricius, 1798)
 Gnathocerus maxillosus (Fabricius, 1810)

References

Tenebrionidae